Diego Andrade Silva Bispo or simply Diego Bispo  (born January 5, 1989 in Salvador), is a Brazilian defender. He currently plays for Altos.

Honours 
Náutico
Copa Pernambuco: 2011

Paysandu
Campeonato Paraense: 2013

Altos
Campeonato Piauiense: 2017

References

1989 births
Living people
Brazilian footballers
Association football forwards
Campeonato Brasileiro Série A players
Campeonato Brasileiro Série B players
Campeonato Brasileiro Série C players
Galícia Esporte Clube players
Clube Náutico Capibaribe players
Santa Cruz Futebol Clube players
Paysandu Sport Club players
Clube Náutico Marcílio Dias players
Vila Nova Futebol Clube players
Esporte Clube Pelotas players
Itumbiara Esporte Clube players
Central Sport Club players
Associação Atlética de Altos players
Sportspeople from Salvador, Bahia